KDRP-LP (103.1 FM), is a radio station licensed to Dripping Springs, Texas, United States. The station is currently owned by Principle Broadcasting Foundation.

KDRP focuses on the music of the great American traditions of Rock and Roll, Blues, R&B, the authentic genres of Country such as Honky-Tonk, Western Swing, and Rockabilly.

Mission
KDRP's mission in part, is to preserve the culture of Texas music with a minimal impact on the environment. We help foster new radio broadcasting careers for the residents of the Texas Hill Country and provide 24-hour a day, free local radio for the communities we serve. Proceeds are used to expand local programming, in the creation of local jobs, as support for other non-profit organizations, to broadcast local musicians and events, and in funding new capital projects designed to increase our coverage area.

Personalities

 Kevin Conner – Weekday Mornings 6am–11am; "A Hill Country Saturday" 9am–2pm
 Mark Murray – Weekdays 3pm–7pm
 Ben Bethea – "The Road to Midnight" Tuesdays – Thursdays 9pm–12am; "Rollin' Radio" Fridays 9pm–12am and Saturdays 5pm–9pm
 Mike Buck – "Blue Monday" Mondays 7pm–9pm
 Larry Monroe – "Phil Music Archives" Sundays 9pm-12am – "Blue Monday Master Tapes" Mondays 9pm-12am
 John Dromgoole – "Dance Halls And Last Calls" Wednesdays 8pm and Sundays 1pm
 David Arnsberger – "Texas Radio Live" & "Pioneers of Texas Music"
 Jim Swift – "Porch Radio" Thursdays 7pm–9pm
 Nancy Holt – Thursdays & Fridays 7pm–9pm; Saturdays 2pm–5pm
 Ed Miller – "Across The Pond" Sundays at 6pm

Sports

KDRP broadcast the Dripping Springs Tigers high school sports and can be heard on 103.1FM in Dripping Springs and on KDRP.org.

References

External links
Sun Radio website
 

DRP-LP
DRP-LP
DRP-LP
Americana radio stations